Tracy Michael Woodson (born October 5, 1962) is an American former professional baseball player and college coach. He played all or part of five seasons in Major League Baseball (MLB), from 1987 to 1989 and 1992 to 1993, primarily as a third baseman. He currently coaches the Richmond Spiders baseball team.

Playing career
Woodson played college baseball for NC State from 1982 to 1984.  His teammates included Doug Davis, Dan Plesac, Doug Strange, and Jim Toman. In 1983, he played collegiate summer baseball with the Hyannis Mets of the Cape Cod Baseball League.

Over his five-year major league career, he played with the Los Angeles Dodgers and the St. Louis Cardinals. Woodson was a member of the Los Angeles Dodgers team that won the 1988 World Series. Notably, against the Cincinnati Reds on September 16 of that year, he struck out for the 27th and final out in Tom Browning's perfect game. Woodson pinch-hit for Dodgers right-hander Tim Belcher. His first career home-run came off of Hall of Fame pitcher Nolan Ryan.

Coaching career
After his playing career was over, he managed for several years in minor league baseball, where he compiled a record of 443 wins and 468 losses and the 2003 Southern League championship with the Carolina Mudcats.  Prior to the start of 2007 season, he was named the head baseball coach at Valparaiso, where he coached for seven seasons (2007–13) and led the program to two NCAA Tournament appearances. Prior to the start of the 2014 season, he left Valparaiso to become the head coach of Richmond.

He also works as a Division I men's college basketball referee.

Minor League Baseball managerial record

Head coaching record
The following is a table of Woodson's NCAA head coaching records.

See also
 List of current NCAA Division I baseball coaches

References

External links

1962 births
Living people
Albuquerque Dukes players
Albuquerque Isotopes managers
American expatriate baseball players in Canada
Baseball coaches from Virginia
Baseball players from Richmond, Virginia
Columbus Clippers players
Hyannis Harbor Hawks players
Iowa Cubs players
Los Angeles Dodgers players
Louisville Redbirds players
Major League Baseball third basemen
NC State Wolfpack baseball players
Richmond Braves players
Richmond Spiders baseball coaches
Rochester Red Wings players
St. Louis Cardinals players
San Antonio Dodgers players
Valparaiso Beacons baseball coaches
Vancouver Canadians players
Vero Beach Dodgers players